The Globe International Silent Film Festival (GISFF) is an annual event focusing on image and non-verbal cinema which takes place in a reputable university or academic environment every year and is a platform for showcasing and judging films from filmmakers who are active in this field. Considering the festivals policies regarding different academic environments each year as a host, the date of the festival may vary from February to April.

History
The festival began its second year in a global scale with the approach to extend its worldwide cultural activities, and collaborated, in an independent fashion, with other universities and academic institutions. The second year of the festival was hosted by Michigan State University. That year – same as the last edition – the festival received films in the four categories of Fiction, Documentary, Animation and experimental. The 2nd year of the Globe International Silent Film Festival was directed by Raha Amirfazli

The third edition of the festival was held in 2018, being hosted by the University of Wisconsin-Madison. Also being directed by Raha Amirfazli that year, the festival received short non-verbal films in five categories of Fiction, Documentary, Animation, Experimental and Super short (under 3 minutes).

The Fifth edition of the festival was canceled because of the COVID-19 Pandemic. Nastaran Dorgaraei the director of the festival decided to announce nominees and winners online. The festival received short non-verbal films in four categories of Fiction, Animation, Documentary, and Experimental.

Silent Film Week
A side project of the festival is the festival's Silent Film Week. This event takes place a week before or at the same time with the screenings of the competition section of the festival, and includes a week's screening of the leading and distinguished films of this field from the history of cinema.

The focus of the first year's film week of the festival was on the films of Victor Sjöström. However, in addition to Sjostrom's films, films of other directors such as Yasujirō Ozu, Fritz Lang, Mauritz Stiller, Carl Theodor Dreyer, Robert Wiene, and Karlheinz Martin, as well as short Avant-garde and experimental films were shown in collaboration with the Tehran Museum of Contemporary Art.

The second Silent Film Week was held in Michigan State University focusing on the works of Carl Theodor Dreyer.

The third edition of the Film week was held in The Tehran University of Art, Faculty of Cinema and Theater, screening non-verbal films from modern and silent era directors such as Marshall Neilman, Josef von Sternberg, Edward Sedgwick, Godfrey Reggio, Michael Dudok de Wit and King Vidor.

The Globe Community of Silent Filmmakers 
The Globe Community of Silent Filmmakers (The GlobeCSF) was founded in 2016 by Pouria Mousavi with the goal to build a strong connection between silent filmmakers around the world, as well as to create a platform for producing and supporting short-film making, and will shortly end its first official year of activity by middle of 2017. In order to achieve this goal, the primary links are the directors, screenwriters and producers present in The Globe International Silent Film Festival (GISFF). First and foremost, the goal of the Globe Community of Silent Filmmakers is to create a platform through which the filmmakers, producers, and screenwriters of the films present in previous editions of the Globe International Silent Film Festival can communicate with each other.

The members of the Globe Community of Silent Filmmakers are its most precious assets. The community has filmmakers, producers, and screenwriters from 10 different countries as members. Part of the duty to the members of the Community of Silent Filmmakers is to promote their professional endeavors, in order for the audience of short films – especially in Iran – to get to know them better. To introduce the work of the silent filmmakers who are members of the community, the community has arranged for special screenings with focus on modern silent cinema, and will also have further screenings in the future as well.

The members of the Community of Silent Filmmakers are held in high esteem. As a result, the members of this family, in addition to viewing the entries of the Globe Community of Silent Filmmakers every year, will choose the winner of the creativity award.

This community took part, with extreme selectiveness, in the production and distribution of two short films, “Lunch Time” and “Madness”. The short film Lunch Time, produced and directed by Alireza Ghasemi and a production of the GlobeCSF has so far been nominated the short film competition in the 70th Cannes Film Festival.

Awards
 Best Fiction Film
 Best Documentary Film
 Best Animation Film
 Best Experimental Film
 Best Super Short Film
Best Director
Best Script
Special Jury Award
  Special Audience Award
 The Creativity Award
 The Secretary's choice

Winners of the previous editions

References

External links
 The festival's official website
 The festival's webpage on FilmFreeway

Film festivals held in multiple countries
Silent film